Valerie Farrell (born 15 December 1946) is an Australia former cricketer who played as a right-handed batter and right-arm medium bowler. She appeared in 5 One Day Internationals: two for International XI at the 1973 World Cup and three for Australia at the 1978 World Cup. She played domestic cricket for Victoria.

References

External links

Valerie Farrell at southernstars.org.au

Living people
1946 births
Australian women cricketers
International XI women One Day International cricketers
Cricketers from Melbourne
Victoria women cricketers
People from Carlton, Victoria